Clover Heart's is an adult visual novel developed by ALcot.

Characters
   Voiced by: Ryōko Tanaka
   Voiced by: Aoi Kisaragi
   Voiced by: Kana Fumiduki
   Voiced by: Suzune Kusunoki
   Voiced by: Mahiru Kaneda
   Voiced by: "Yuki"
   Voiced by: Tsukasa Madera
  
  
  
   Voiced by: Ayumu Nakazawa
  
   The PS2 exclusive character.Voiced by: Mia Naruse

Releases
Clover Heart's was first released for PC on four CDs on November 28, 2003. On June 25, 2004, a DVD edition of the game was released.

The game was ported to the PlayStation 2 as Clover Heart's: Looking for Happiness. The PS2 version has the pornographic elements removed, but features the new character Airi Momose. Looking for Happiness was released in three versions: a limited edition, standard edition, and Best version (budget release). The limited edition came with a bonus drama CD.

Another port for FOMA mobile phones was released on December 28, 2004.

Lastly, it was ported as a DVD TV game on January 26, 2006.

External links
 Page for the original version 
 Page for the DVD version 
 Page for Clover Heart's: Looking for Happiness 
 English review of the game

2003 video games
Bishōjo games
DVD interactive technology
Eroge
HuneX games
Japan-exclusive video games
Mobile games
PlayStation 2 games
Single-player video games
Video games developed in Japan
Visual novels
Windows games
ALcot games